Debarking is the process of removing bark from wood. Traditional debarking is conducted in order to create a fence post or fence stake which would then go on to be pointed before being planted. Debarking can occur naturally during powerful tornadoes.

Process
Debarking generally involves the use of industrial machinery into which the log or stake is placed.  These machines can be either stationary or portable. Generally they are powered by hydraulic motors but can also be driven by a power take-off. The log or stake is then pressed against blades or knives which remove the bark while the log is turned to ensure the removal of bark from all around the log. Debarking can also take place by hand, although this can be very time consuming and may not be suitable for large volumes.

See also
 Hydraulic debarker
 Girdling

References

Logging